Hapoel Ironi Baqa al-Gharbiyye is an Israeli football club based in Baqa al-Gharbiyye. The club currently plays in Liga Alef North division.

History
The club was founded in 2010, eight years after the previous Hapoel Baqa al-Gharbiyye club had folded at the end of the 2001–02 season, after last played in Liga Bet North B division.

The club finished the 2010–11 season on top of Liga Gimel Samaria division and achieved promotion to Liga Bet. The club's best placing to date, was achieved in the 2013–14 season, when they finished runners-up in the North B division, missing out on promotion to Liga Alef by a single point, to Ironi Nesher. The club qualified for the Promotion play-offs, where they beat Maccabi Kafr Qara 2–1 in the first round. However, in the second round, they lost 2–4 to Maccabi Ahi Iksal and remained in Liga Bet. At the same season, the club have qualified to the round of 32 of the Israel State Cup, in which clubs from the Israeli Premier League have entered the competition. However, they were drawn against Maccabi Sektzia Ma'alot-Tarshiha which played in Liga Bet North A division, and lost the match by a result of 2–4.

In the 2014–15 season, the club won Liga Bet North B division and made historic promotion to the third tier, Liga Alef.

Honours

League

Cups

External links
Hapoel Ironi Baqa al-Gharbiyye  Israel Football Association

References

Football clubs in Israel
Hapoel football clubs
Association football clubs established in 1966
Association football clubs established in 2010
1966 establishments in Israel
2010 establishments in Israel
Arab-Israeli football clubs